Haichao Temple is a Buddhist temple located in Shangcheng District of Hangzhou, Zhejiang. Alongside Lingyin Temple, Jing Temple and Zhaoqing Temple, it was one of the Four Buddhist Temples in Hangzhou.

History
Haichao Temple was originally built in the Wanli period (1573–1620) of the Ming dynasty (1368–1644). Haichao Temple was gradually fell into ruin when the Manchu invasion in the mid-17th century. The Bell Tower and Guanyin Hall were added to the temple in 1829, during the reign of Daoguang Emperor in the Qing dynasty (1644–1911). Haichao Temple was badly damaged in the Taiping Rebellion in 1861. It was renovated and refurbished in 1864. In 1881, abbot Puzhao built the Buddhist Texts Library for collecting a set of Chinese Buddhist canon, which was granted by Guangxu Emperor.

After the Second Sino-Japanese War broke out, it was used as the First Provisional Assistant Hospital of Zhejiang Province. In 1958, it became a rubber plant, which was officially called Zhongce Rubber Co., Ltd. in 1992. In 2016, the Hangzhou government planned to rebuild the temple on its original site.

In July 2000, it was inscribed as a municipal level cultural relic conservation unit by the Hangzhou government.

Architecture
The temple formerly had many halls and rooms and now only the Hall of Four Heavenly Kings survived. The Hall of Four Heavenly Kings was built in 1890, during the ruling of Guangxu Emperor in late Qing dynasty (1644–1911).

References

Buddhist temples in Zhejiang
Buildings and structures in Hangzhou
Tourist attractions in Hangzhou
19th-century establishments in China
19th-century Buddhist temples